Sherwood High School High School may refer to:

Sherwood High School (Maryland) in Sandy Spring, Maryland
 Sherwood High School (Missouri) in Creighton, Missouri
 Sherwood High School (North Dakota) in Sherwood, North Dakota
Sherwood High School (Oregon) in Sherwood, Oregon
 Sherwood High School (Bannerghatta Road) in south Bengaluru